Porrex I was a legendary king of the Britons as accounted by Geoffrey of Monmouth.  He was the son of Gorboduc and his death began a dynastic civil war.

In the final years of Gorboduc's life, Porrex waged war with his brother, Ferrex.  He planned to ambush his brother but his brother fled to Gaul to enlist the aide of Suhard, the king of the Franks.  When Ferrex returned with a large Gaulish army, Porrex attacked and Ferrex and the army were defeated.  Some time after, his mother, Judon, avenged Porrex's murder of Ferrex and hacked him to pieces in his sleep.  His death sparked a civil war which would not be resolved until the reign of Dunvallo Molmutius.  His death shifted the dominant genealogical royal house of Brutus to another house, Cornwall.

References 

Legendary British kings